Novaculops is a genus of wrasses native to the Indian and Pacific Oceans.

Species
The currently recognized species in this genus are:
 Novaculops alvheimi J. E. Randall, 2013 (St. Brandon's sandy)
 Novaculops halsteadi (J. E. Randall & Lobel, 2003) (Halstead's sandy)
 Novaculops koteamea (J. E. Randall & G. R. Allen, 2004) (Rapanui sandy)
 Novaculops pastellus (J. E. Randall, Earle & L. A. Rocha, 2008) (Lord Howe sandy)
 Novaculops sciistius (D. S. Jordan & W. F. Thompson, 1914) (oriental sandy)
 Novaculops woodi (O. P. Jenkins, 1901) (Hawaiian sandy)

References

Labridae
Taxa named by Leonard Peter Schultz
Marine fish genera